Love and War in the Apennines is a 1971 Second World War memoir (with some changes of names and people and places, and some composite characters) by Eric Newby. In the United States the title was changed to When the Snow Comes, They Will Take You Away. It was dramatised as the 2001 film In Love and War starring Callum Blue and Barbora Bobuľová.

Overview 
After the Armistice between Italy and Allied armed forces in 1943, the author left the prisoner-of-war camp in which he had been held for a year, PG 49 at Fontanellato, and evaded the Germans by going to ground high in the mountains and forests south of the Po River. In enforced isolation, he was sheltered and protected by an informal and highly courageous network of Italian peasants. Newby writes a powerful account of these idiosyncratic and selfless people and also of their bleak and very basic lifestyle. He undergoes a series of bizarre, funny and often dangerous incidents, and in the process meets Wanda, a local girl who later becomes his wife.

Summary 

Newby takes part in a Special Boat Service operation on the east coast of Sicily. He and his colleagues fail to make their rendezvous with a British submarine and are picked up by a fishing boat.

Newby is imprisoned in an orphanage at Fontanellato in the Po valley. With the Armistizio, the Italians let the English prisoners escape. Because Newby has a broken ankle he is abandoned and is hidden in a farmer's hay loft until an Italian doctor takes him to the hospital. Here he is visited by Wanda, the daughter of a Slovene teacher, who gives him Italian lessons in exchange for English lessons and they fall in love. The Germans discover he is there but Newby escapes and hides, moving from one house to another.

Newby is nearly captured and moves into the mountains to stay with a shepherd; villagers build him a camouflaged cave. Further exciting adventures follow, and a meeting with Wanda.

Reception 

The New York Times wrote of Love and War that "His memoir of that time became one of his most acclaimed books".

The novelist Simon Mawer, writing on the NPR website, describes the book as follows:

Travel writer John Gimlette, writing in The Guardian, comments that "For sheer charm, there's nothing quite like Eric Newby's Love and War in the Apennines." He adds that while it is plainly a celebration of Italy, "At a more profound level, it's a beautifully philanthropic yet unsentimental work. However miserable the times and awkward the place, Newby's characters are usually endearing, and often complex."

Sources 

 Love and War in the Apennines, Picador (1983)

References

Sources
  
 
 
 
 

1971 British novels
British autobiographical novels
Novels set during World War II
Novels set in Italy
Hodder & Stoughton books
British novels adapted into films